These are the results for the women's individual trampoline competition, one of two events of the trampoline discipline contested in the gymnastics at the 2004 Summer Olympics in Athens. The qualification and final rounds took place on August 20 at the Olympic Indoor Hall.

Results

Qualification
Sixteen gymnasts competed in the qualification round by performing a compulsory routine followed by a free routine. For the compulsory routine (#1), each gymnast received a score from 0.0 to 10.0 from each of the five execution judges, with the highest and lowest scores being dropped. The free routine (#2) had a similar format but included a difficulty score, determined by two difficulty judges, which was added to the three kept scores from the execution judges. The scores from the two routines were summed to give the total score and the eight highest scoring gymnasts advanced to the final.

Final
The eight qualified gymnasts performed a single free routine with the same scoring format as in the qualification round.

References

Gymnastics Results.com

Women's trampoline
2004 Women's
2004 in women's gymnastics
Women's events at the 2004 Summer Olympics